The Museum of the Ancient Orient (Turkish language: Eski Şark Eserleri Müzesi) is a museum in Istanbul, and part of the group of Istanbul Archaeology Museums, located just in front of the main Archaeology Museum building. The building of the museum is in the ancient College of Fine Arts (Sanâyi-i Nefîse Mektebi), commissioned by Osman Hamdi Bey in 1883. The museum itself was established in 1935.

Collections

References

Archaeological museums in Turkey
Museums established in 1935
Museums in Istanbul
National museums in Turkey
Museums of Ancient Near East in Turkey